Azerbaijan participated in the Turkvision Song Contest 2013 which took place in Eskişehir, Turkey. Azad Azerbaijan TV (ATV) was responsible for organising their entry for the contest. Farid Hasanov won the national final, Turkvision Milli Seçim Turu, on 22 November with the song "Sənsiz", earning the right to represent Azerbaijan in the contest. It was revealed at the contest that the song Hasanov would be performing would be called "Yaşa". Azerbaijan won the contest with 210 points.

Before Turkvision

Turkvision Milli Seçim Turu
On 19 October 2013, contest organisers announced that Azerbaijan would participate in the inaugural contest. 

ATV organised a televised selection process, auditioning a total of fifty acts on 19 October, 26 October and 2 November 2013. On 5 November 2013, ten of the auditionees were announced to have advanced from the selection process. On 16 November 2013, a national final took place, with the winner of the ten finalists being determined by both a televote and a jury. The national final was hosted by Afag Genceli, Samir Bayramli and Rufat Agayev. 

Farid Hasanov was announced as the winner, thus earning him the right to represent Azerbaijan in the Turkvision Song Contest.

Song selection 
ATV later announced that Hasanov would perform "Yaşa" at the Turkvision Song Contest 2013.

Artist and song information

Farid Hasanov 

Farid Hasanov (born 9 April 1992) is an Azerbaijani singer, who won the Turkvision Song Contest 2013 with the song "Yaşa". Hasanov became the first ever winner of the contest. Earlier that year, Hasanov had unsuccessfully attempted to represent Azerbaijan in the Eurovision Song Contest 2013, but did not advance to the national final.

Yaşa 
"Yaşa" (Translated: "Live long") is a song composed by Govhar Hasanzade and performed by Azerbaijani singer Farid Hasanov at the Turkvision Song Contest 2013. It won the contest with 210 points.

At Turkvision 
Originally, the inaugural Turkvision Song Contest was to have two semi-finals on 19 and 21 December 2013 with the grand final on 23 December 2013. However, it was revealed on 13 December 2013 that only one semi-final would take place on 19 December 2013 with the grand final taking place on 21 December 2013. Both the semi-final and final were broadcast in Azerbaijan on ATV.

Semi-final 
Azerbaijan was drawn to perform second out of the twenty-four countries and areas participating in the semi-final, following the Altai Republic and preceding Bashkortostan. It was revealed before the semi-final that the song "Sənsiz" had been replaced with another song called "Yaşa", written by Govhar Hasanzade. Hasanov placed amongst the top twelve entries in the semi-final, allowing him to advance to the final. The ranking and scores of the semi-finalists were withheld from the public.

Final 
Azerbaijan was drawn to perform ninth out of the twelve countries and areas participating in the final, following the Altai Republic and preceding Northern Cyprus. Hasanov won the final with a margin of 5 points, earning a total of 210 points. For winning the contest, Hasanov was awarded €200,000.

See also 
 Azerbaijan in the Turkvision Song Contest
 Turkvision Song Contest 2013

References

External links 
 Official ATV website

Turkvision
2013
Countries in the Turkvision Song Contest 2013